Randolph Ross (born January 1, 2001) is an American athlete specializing in the 400 metres, who competes collegiately for the North Carolina A&T Aggies. He is coached by his father Duane Ross, who was also an Olympian in the 110m hurdles.

On February 12, 2021 at the Tiger Paw Invitational in Clemson, South Carolina, Ross ran the 400m in 45.21 seconds, which was the fastest time in the nation in 2021 at the time. A day later, he ran the 200m in a time of 20.50 seconds to take over the top spot in the year at that distance as well.
Ross finished second to Noah Williams at the NCAA Division I Indoor Track and Field Championships in February 2021. He also won the event at the 2021 NCAA Division I Outdoor Track and Field Championships, setting a 2021 world leading time of 43.85 seconds. The time ranked him #13 on the all time list. Nine days later he qualified for the 400 m at the 2020 Summer Olympics through finishing third at the US Olympic Trials on June 20, 2021.

On 16 July 2022, Ross was suspended by the Athletics Integrity Unit and barred from participating in the 2022 World Athletics Championships. In December, he was banned for three years retroactively from July 1, 2022 for whereabouts failures and tampering with doping control, having missed three tests and attempted to doctor an email to avoid the last missed test.

References

2001 births
Living people
American male sprinters
North Carolina A&T Aggies men's track and field athletes
African-American track and field athletes
Track and field athletes from Raleigh, North Carolina
Athletes (track and field) at the 2020 Summer Olympics
Medalists at the 2020 Summer Olympics
Olympic gold medalists for the United States in track and field